Helleh va Delleh (also Romanized as Ḩelleh va Delleh; also known as Ḩalleh Delleh, Ḩalvā Dillāy, Ḩelleh Delleh, and Hilloi-o-Dillai) is a village in Anaqcheh Rural District, in the Central District of Ahvaz County, Khuzestan Province, Iran. At the 2006 census, its population was 173, in 35 families.

References 

Populated places in Ahvaz County